William Wall (8 January 1854 – 18 April 1922) was an English cricketer.  Born at Wigan, Lancashire, he was a right-handed batsman and wicket-keeper who made one appearance in first-class cricket.

The son of Thomas Wall, the founder of the Wigan Observer, Wall played his club cricket for Wigan, before making his only appearance in first-class cricket for Lancashire in 1877 against Derbyshire at Derby. Batting in the lower-order, Wall scored an unbeaten 17 in Lancashire's first-innings, but was dismissed without scoring in their second-innings by John Platts. In his capacity as wicket-keeper he took two catches and made two stumpings.

Local parish records indicate that he was by profession a collier. He died at Southport, Lancashire on 18 April 1922. His brothers, Henry and Thomas, both played first-class cricket.

References

External links
William Wall at ESPNcricinfo
William Wall at CricketArchive

1854 births
1922 deaths
Cricketers from Wigan
English cricketers
English miners
Lancashire cricketers